Ammon Edward Bundy (born September 1, 1975) is an American anti-government militant and activist. A car fleet manager by profession, Bundy gained widespread attention by leading the 2016 occupation of the Malheur National Wildlife Refuge. He is the son of rancher Cliven Bundy, who was the central figure in the 2014 Bundy standoff regarding unpaid grazing fees on federally-owned public land.

In March 2020, Bundy created the far-right People's Rights network. During the COVID-19 pandemic, Bundy was arrested more than five times for protests and disruptions against COVID-19 mitigation efforts by the Idaho government.

On June 19, 2021, Bundy announced his intent to run for governor of Idaho. After initially filing to run in the Republican primary, he decided instead to run as an independent in the general election. Bundy lost and placed third in the 2022 election.

Personal life
Ammon Bundy owns a truck repair company and was listed as a member of several Arizona companies. Prior to the Occupation of the Malheur National Wildlife Refuge, he had lost a home in a short sale and was behind on his property taxes.

He has a wife, Lisa, as well as three daughters and three sons. They own a  home in Emmett, Idaho.

2014 Bundy standoff in Bunkerville

Standoff

On April 9, Bundy drove an all-terrain vehicle in front of a Bureau of Land Management (BLM) truck to block it from leaving. Officers told him to move his ATV, and he refused, yelling and approaching them belligerently. When two officers pointed tasers at him and ordered him to back up, Bundy continued to advance. An officer with a police dog approached to compel him to back away from the officers. He repeatedly kicked the police dog and was tasered moments later. After Bundy ripped off the taser wires and advanced toward the officers again, he was tasered a second time. He acknowledged in an interview that he had also climbed on a dump truck that he believed contained his father's cattle.

On or before April 10, Bundy asked the Oath Keepers to request that their volunteers who came to the protest follow certain rules. He asked that they not wear military camouflage and to leave their rifles in their vehicles rather than open carry them. He also asked that they check in with him when they arrived at the protest rally point. In addition, Bundy asked that they not drive past the rally point to the Bundy ranch. He also asked that no protester give a media interview, instead referring the media to Bundy family members, in particular him, his father, or one of his brothers.

On April 10, Cliven and Ammon were interviewed on-air by Fox News' Greta Van Susteren. Cliven said he would only accept a court order from a Nevada state court since he believed that a federal court does not have competent jurisdiction. To that, Ammon added, "If someone came in, busted into my house and abused my children, and so I call the cops, they don't respond, and then I take them to court. I show up at the courtroom, look on the stand, and it's the very person that abused my children looking down at me in a black robe. How in the world are we going to get justice in that court?"

On the morning of April 12, BLM had corralled about 400 of Cliven's cattle. Ammon and a group of protesters went to the makeshift impoundment site and formed a line across it. Bureau of Land Management agents called for backup but were outnumbered, with about 400 protesters to the 50 officers present at the scene. The officers ordered the crowd to disperse over a loudspeaker, but they would not. Instead, gunmen started to gather, causing the officers to retreat.

On April 14, Ammon, along with Cliven and his brother Ryan, were interviewed on-air by Fox News' Sean Hannity. Ammon said, "I'd [participate in the standoff] again, and after it was all over, I couldn't have felt better." Asked about remarks from Senator Harry Reid that the situation was not over, despite BLM's withdrawal from the standoff, Ammon responded, "Well, if he doesn't have enough moral fiber in his bones at all to see what happened, that 'We the People' got together and made something right, then I don't think there's any hope for him, and he needs to be kicked out of office, even if he is the Senate majority leader, it doesn't matter."

Prosecution
On February 7, 2016, Ammon Bundy—along with his father Cliven, brother Ryan, and others—were indicted in the U.S. District Court for the District of Nevada for their roles in the 2014 Bundy standoff. The men were charged with 16 felony counts: one count of "conspiracy to commit an offense against the United States"; one count of "conspiracy to impede or injure a federal officer"; four counts of "using and carrying a firearm in relation to a crime of violence"; two counts of "assault on a federal officer"; two counts of "threatening a federal law enforcement officer"; three counts of "obstruction of the due administration of justice"; two counts of "interference with interstate commerce by extortion"; and one count of "interstate travel in aid of extortion."

This prosecution is separate from the Malheur Refuge occupation prosecution in the U.S. District Court for the District of Oregon. In early April 2016, Judge Brown of the Oregonian prosecution approved an order to send the four defendants charged in both cases, including Ammon and Ryan Bundy, to Nevada to make an appearance in court there. The men were transported to Las Vegas by U.S. Marshals, and on April 16, 2016, Ammon Bundy and the four other militants refused to enter pleas in regards to their roles in the standoff, prompting U.S. Magistrate Judge George Foley Jr. to enter not-guilty pleas on their behalf.  In the unusually long arraignment, Bundy asked for the 64-page indictment to be read aloud in court.

The trial for the Bundy standoff case was set for February 2017 in Nevada.

Mistrial and acquittal
On January 8, 2018, Navarro declared the mistrial to be with prejudice, effectively dismissing the charges, on the grounds that the defendants could not receive a fair trial. "The court finds that the universal sense of justice has been violated," the federal judge was quoted to have written in an order, as reported in the Los Angeles Times.

Appeal  
In August 2020, the U.S. Court of Appeals for the Ninth Circuit in San Francisco denied an appeal by federal prosecutors to reinstate the criminal prosecution of the Bundy's related to the 2014 armed standoff in Nevada and the 2016 armed protest and occupation of the Malheur National Wildlife Refuge in Oregon.  The appeals court upheld the dismissal of the case on grounds of the prosecution's withholding of materials requested by defense attorneys was proper. The court stopped short of affirming that prosecutorial misconduct had occurred and stated that "misjudgments" by prosecutors did not rise to professional misconduct in the case.

2016 militant occupation

Prelude to the occupation

In 2015, ranchers Dwight and Steve Hammond were resentenced to five years for two counts of arson on federal land, after their original sentence was vacated by the U.S. Court of Appeals for the Ninth Circuit. By late 2015, the Hammond case had attracted the attention of Ammon and (his brother) Ryan Bundy. Although the ranchers rejected Bundy's assistance, Bundy decided to lead an armed occupation of the headquarters area of the Malheur National Wildlife Refuge on January 2, 2016. He referred to his group as the Citizens for Constitutional Freedom and remarked that it could be a lengthy stay.

Occupation

Bundy's father Cliven said that he was not involved in the occupation, and that it was "not exactly what I thought should happen".

Early in the standoff, a Twitter user claiming to be Ammon Bundy tweeted a statement comparing the group to civil rights activist Rosa Parks. The account was later found to be a hoax. Despite this, other involved militants have made comparisons with Parks.

Speaking through his lawyer Mike Arnold the day after his arrest (see below), Bundy urged those remaining at the refuge to "please stand down" and go home.

Apprehension
Bundy was peacefully arrested on January 26, 2016, when the vehicle he was traveling in was pulled over by a joint force of FBI agents and troopers from Oregon State Patrol. He was with other militants from the occupation attempting to drive to John Day, Oregon for a public meeting where he was scheduled to speak. Another vehicle in the convoy fled the traffic stop until it encountered a roadblock, where Oregon State Patrol officers shot and killed LaVoy Finicum.

Pretrial court appearances and indictment relating to Malheur
On January 29, Bundy appeared before U.S. Magistrate Judge Stacie F. Beckerman alongside several other jailed militants. He explained the motives of the occupation to the court, saying that his "only goal from the beginning was to protect freedom for the people." However, Judge Beckerman denied him and the other militants release from jail, explaining that she would not release them as long as the occupation continued. That same day, Bundy offered to plead guilty to the federal conspiracy charge alone, in exchange for the dismissal of the other charges against him, the dismissal of all of the charges filed against the other militants in custody at the time, and letting militants still at the refuge to leave peacefully without arrest. However, federal prosecutors rejected the offer. Bundy later repeatedly urged the militants remaining at the refuge to stand down and go home.

In a March 3 interview, Bundy described his life in jail and continued to explain his motives regarding the occupation. Although he did not witness Finicum's death, Bundy also asserted Finicum had been cooperating with officers before they shot him.

On March 8, the federal grand jury in Oregon returned a new, superseding indictment that unsealed the following day, charging Bundy and 25 co-defendants with a variety of crimes in relation to the occupation. Bundy was charged with a total of three offenses: conspiracy to impede officers of the United States by force, intimidation, or threats; possession of firearms and dangerous weapons in federal facilities; and using and carrying firearms in relation to a crime of violence. The latter offense carries a possible life sentence.

Bundy's attorney, Mike Arnold of Eugene, Oregon, was accused of organizing a social media harassment campaign against the public agencies involved in evidence gathering and prosecution of the case, and in particular the Oregon State Police. The Southern Poverty Law Center reported that sovereign citizen movement members also attempted to insert themselves into the case, filing a flurry of paperwork in a tactic common to the movement known as paper terrorism. Arnold also faced ethics complaints regarding attempts to unduly influence the potential jury pool and for possible ethical violations involving visits by Arnold's law firm to Bundy and other militants prior to their arrests, offering legal services. The complaint was later dropped by the Oregon State Bar on the basis that there was no sufficient basis to refer the lawyers to disciplinary counsel.

On May 9, Bundy's legal team filed new court papers stating that he believed the occupation would result in a civil court taking up the constitutionality of the U.S. government's federal land management policy. The papers also said that Bundy did not expect the militants to be indicted and arrested on federal charges in criminal court. As a result, he began urging the court to dismiss the indictments against the militants, citing his legal team's defense strategy. His lawyers also explained Bundy's beliefs that two U.S. Supreme Court cases addressing his defense strategy "were wrongly decided and should be overruled": a 1935 ruling that the government has had ownership over the refuge's wetlands and lake-beds since the 1840s; and a following ruling that the country's laws have sole control over the disposition of title to its lands, and that the states have no power to establish limitations or restrictions over that control. Bundy countered the rulings with Article 1, Section 8 of the U.S. Constitution, which limits the federal government's powers to acquire and own property, and the fact that no federal court has addressed the question of whether the government can hold "the majority of the land within a state." These motions were rejected by U.S. District Judge Anna J. Brown, citing longstanding Supreme Court precedent establishing the federal government's power to own and manage public land under the Property Clause as being "without limitations," and ruled that Bundy was "mistaken" in his belief that the existence of the wildlife refuge is unconstitutional.

On May 26, Bundy filed a "substitution of counsel" document, removing the Arnold Law Firm from the case and hiring J. Morgan Philpot as his lawyer. On June 7, a pro hac vice special admission request was filed in the U.S. District Court for the District of Oregon to allow Utah attorney Marcus Mumford to assist Bundy.

On June 10, Judge Brown dismissed one of two firearms charges against Bundy and seven other militants, finding that the underlying conspiracy charge does not meet the legal definition of a "crime of violence" as defined by Ninth Circuit case law.

On June 30, Bundy's defense team filed a motion asking for a delay for their client's September 7 Oregon trial, explaining they needed more time to prepare. In the motion, the defense team argued that several pretrial motions were not resolved and Bundy's continued detention in jail "has rendered it virtually impossible for him to participate meaningfully in his defense." The lawyers also asked the court to "allow Bundy another two months to argue for his release pending trial and to help prepare his defense to challenge the federal charges". On July 6, Judge Brown denied this request for a delay in trial.

On August 2, Bundy made plans to appeal two federal court orders to keep him in custody pending trial. His lawyer informed the U.S. District Court of Oregon that he would file an emergency motion to postpone the trial unless they examine his client's appeal.

In September 2016, Ammon and Ryan Bundy (through Ammon's lawyers, Philpot and Marcus Mumford), filed a motion seeking to permit his client to wear "cowboy" attire in court. The U.S. Marshals Service's policy barred the defendants from wearing ties, boots, and belts, for safety reasons. Denying the motion on grounds that this policy is rational and that the Bundys did not show their attire would prejudice their case, Judge Brown said Ammon was "dressed better than most people in the building, period." On October 27, 2016, a jury acquitted seven of the defendants. Five of them were released but Ammon Bundy and his brother Ryan remained in federal custody pending trial on charges related to the 2014 Bundy standoff.

Trial dates relating to Malheur and verdict
Jury selection for Bundy's trial began on September 7, 2016. Judge Brown said the case would require an unusually large jury pool. Eleven of 31 potential jurors were excused for a variety of reasons, such as opinions regarding the occupation and also personal hardships. By September 9, 2016, 62 people were identified as potential jurors. Twelve jurors (consisting of eight women and four men) and eight alternates were selected by the end of the day. Opening statements were scheduled for September 13, 2016.

Eight other co-defendants in the occupation were also originally set for trial on that September 7, 2016, and a further nine co-defendants were set for trial beginning February 14, 2017.

In July 2016, with six weeks before the beginning of the first trial in the case, nine of Bundy's fellow militants pleaded guilty, including three of nine militants who were part of Bundy's "inner circle". Of those three, two were reported to be negotiating "a resolution to a federal indictment in Nevada as well" (see below). By August, the total number of militants pleading guilty had increased to eleven.

On October 27, 2016, Ammon Bundy was found not guilty on all counts.

Post-occupation

Statements on LDS church
Bundy also claimed that the federal government's prosecution of him and his supporters following confrontations in Nevada and Oregon is really a "battle of High priests" of the LDS church. He said he, his father, and his attorney are all high priests in the church, as well as the lead U.S. attorney prosecuting his family, the chief judge in Oregon, and former Nevada Senator Harry Reid.

Bundy has publicly claimed to be an active and devout member of the Church of Jesus Christ of Latter-day Saints.

Concerning the Oregon occupation, the church stated that "Church leaders strongly condemn the armed seizure of the facility and are deeply troubled by the reports that those who have seized the facility suggest that they are doing so based on scriptural principles."

Disavowal of militia movement
In December 2018, Bundy disavowed the militia movement due to his disagreement with President Donald Trump's immigration policy, specifically regarding the Central American migrant caravan. He said, "To group them all up like, frankly, our president has done — you know, trying to speak respectfully — but he has basically called them all criminals and said they're not coming in here. What about individuals, those who have come for reasons of need for their families, you know, the fathers and mothers and children that come here and were willing to go through the process to apply for asylum so they can come into this country and benefit from not having to be oppressed continually?" Bundy also claimed that nationalism does not equal patriotism and compared the modern-day United States to 1930s Nazi Germany. In 2018, Bundy compared Trump to Adolf Hitler.

Black Lives Matter movement
Bundy has expressed support for the Black Lives Matter and defund the police movements. In July 2020, he said "you must have a problem in your mind if you think that somehow the Black Lives Matter is more dangerous than the police" and "there needs to be a defunding of government in general, and especially the police forces because they're the ones who are actually going to seek and destroy us."

Idaho stay-at-home order and COVID-19 legislation protests
On March 26, 2020, Idaho's Governor Brad Little issued a stay-at-home order due to the 2020 coronavirus pandemic in Idaho. After the order, Bundy held a meeting at an industrial building in Emmett with "Bundy pledging to help provide legal, political and physical defense to people who are pressured by the "authorities" or anybody else to comply with the order."

On April 21, after anti-vaccination activist Sara Walton Brady was arrested for misdemeanor trespassing, Bundy and a group of 40 people stood outside the arresting police officer's home for 30 minutes.

On August 24, Ammon Bundy led a large number of maskless protesters at the Idaho State Capitol to protest the Idaho mandate that people in public are required to wear face masks in response to the COVID-19 pandemic.  Bundy and the protesters with him disrupted an emergency legislative session which was considering legal immunity legislation related to the reopening of public schools in the State of Idaho.

On August 25, the speaker of the Idaho House of Representatives closed the auditorium at the State Capitol and ordered protesters to leave the building.  Ammon Bundy and three others refused to leave when directed to do so by Idaho State Police Officers, and were arrested for criminal trespass.  Bundy was also charged with resisting arrest and was wheeled out of the building handcuffed in a rolling chair.

On August 26, Bundy and a number of protesters returned to the State Capitol during the emergency legislative session.  Ammon Bundy was served with a no-trespass letter directed to him from the Governor of Idaho, the Speaker of the Idaho House of Representatives, and a State Administrative official and told to leave the building.  He again refused to leave and was arrested by Idaho State Police for criminal trespass and resisting arrest, and was taken out of the building handcuffed in a wheelchair. On August 31, Bundy posted a one-hour video on YouTube explaining his version of the events that transpired at the Idaho State Capitol Building which led to his arrest following over two days of protest activities of the Idaho Legislature Special Session.  Bundy claimed that he had the permission of the Speaker of the Idaho House of Representatives to be present at the special session and that he had been respectful of the legislative process, and peaceful at all times during the protests.  Bundy also disavowed that he was the leader or organizer of the protests and that the protesters were very much acting on their own when they disrupted the emergency legislative session of the Idaho Legislature. Bundy's trial for trespassing and resisting arrest charges ran from Monday, June 28, 2021 to Thursday, July 1, 2021. He was found guilty on all charges and sentenced to 48 hours community service in lieu of five days jailtime, and was required to pay a $500 fine plus court costs of $417.

Bundy attended a football game between Emmett and Caldwell High Schools on October 2, 2020; he refused to wear a mask and was denied entry. After attempting to watch the game from the parking lot, he was asked to leave but refused. The game was declared over at halftime due to threats made toward the school by those who had refused to wear masks.

On March 15, 2021 he was once again arrested after refusing to wear a face mask inside an Idaho courthouse and missing the court date for his offenses regarding the Idaho legislature protests.

On April 8, 2021, Bundy was arrested two more times at the Idaho State Capitol on two charges of misdemeanor trespassing and one charge of misdemeanor resisting or obstructing.

2022 Idaho gubernatorial election 

On May 21, 2021, Bundy filed paperwork to run for governor in the state of Idaho in 2022. However, being his own campaign treasurer and not being a registered voter in the state, his paperwork was rejected. He had later claimed that while he did file treasurer appointment paperwork, he had not made up his mind regarding a gubernatorial run. On June 19, 2021, he announced a bid for the Republican nomination, indicating that his aims are to protect Idaho from "Joe Biden and those in the Deep State that control him," stating that they are attempting to eliminate freedom of religion, gun rights, and parental rights. Bundy says he wants to eliminate property taxation and Idaho state income taxes. Bundy's electoral bid was endorsed by Trump advisor Roger Stone, despite Bundy's vocal opposition to Trump's immigration policies.

On February 17, 2022, after reports began circulating that he had cut a mutual endorsement deal with Republican Lt. Gov. Janice McGeachin, Bundy made a post on Twitter calling those reports false, declaring, "the Republican establishment in Idaho is full of filth and corruption and they refuse to put forth the party platform," and they are in a "corrupt and wicked state." After attacks on various prominent Idaho Republicans, including state party Chairman Jonathan Parker ("wearing a wig and masturbating in public)", U.S. Senator Mike Crapo and former governor Butch Otter (arrests for DUI), state representative Greg Cheney [sic] (domestic violence and suicide threats), state senator Fred Martin (entering a high school girls' bathroom, twice), Ada County Sheriff Steve Bartlett (trading promotions for sexual favors), and U.S. Senator Larry Craig (soliciting sex in an airport bathroom), Bundy concluded by stating his intention to reclaim the Republican Party, "take back control of the Idaho government," and "restore... conservative values" by running as an independent candidate "behind the actual Republican platform" rather than in the Republican primary. Bundy's campaign was interrupted on March 12; he was arrested for trespassing at a hospital in Idaho. Bundy was attempting to interfere with officers investigating reports of child neglect.  He came in third in the November 8, 2022, Idaho general election.

Electoral history

References

External links
 Bundy family's official blog

1975 births
American activists
American prisoners and detainees
Bundy standoff
Idaho Republicans
Latter Day Saints from Arizona
Latter Day Saints from Idaho
Latter Day Saints from Nevada
Living people
People from Bunkerville, Nevada
People from Emmett, Idaho
People from Phoenix, Arizona
Right-wing populism in the United States
Alt-right activists
Far-right politicians in the United States
Sovereign citizen movement individuals